XXL is an American hip hop magazine, published by Townsquare Media, founded in 1997.

History
In August 1997, Harris Publications released the first issue of XXL. It featured rappers Jay-Z and Master P on a double cover. In December 2006, XXL took over the struggling hip-hop producer and DJ magazine Scratch (another publication owned by Harris Publications), re-branding it as XXL Presents Scratch Magazine. However Scratch shut down less than a year later in September 2007.

Other titles with limited runs have been launched under the XXL brand, including Hip-Hop Soul, Eye Candy and Shade45. XXL has released many other special projects including tour programs, mixtapes and exclusive DVDs. XXL also maintains a popular website, which provides daily hip hop news, original content and content from the magazine.

In 2014, Townsquare Media acquired XXL, King and Antenna from Harris Publications.

On October 14, 2014, Townsquare announced it would continue print publication of XXL. In December 2014 the company reported that the magazine would be published on a monthly basis.

Past editors
The magazine's past editors include Reginald C. Dennis (formerly of  The Source), Sheena Lester (former editor-in-chief of RapPages and Vibe music editor), Elliott Wilson (formerly of The Beat-Down Newspaper, ego trip and The Source, currently locked in at #7 slot on The Source's Digital 30 list.) and Datwon Thomas (former editor-in-chief of King).

In May 2009, Datwon Thomas resigned from XXL and executive editor Vanessa Satten, who had been with XXL since 1998, was named the new Editor-in-Chief.

Special releases

In August 2005, Eminem and XXL teamed up to release a special issue titled XXL Presents Shade 45, designed to simultaneously give maximum exposure to his radio station Shade 45, the station's associated radio DJs, the Shady Records label as a whole, and G-Unit Records' artists. XXL executive publisher Jonathan Rheingold stated that typically magazines based around particular artists were not favorable, but "since Shade 45 is a truly authentic and uncensored rap radio channel, the marriage with the XXL brand made sense," feeling that it would interest rap fans.

In November 2008, XXL released XXL Raps Volume 1, which included music from 50 Cent, G-Unit, Common, Jim Jones, & Fabolous.

In September 2006, XXL put a special 90-minute DVD called XXL DVD Magazine Vol. 1, which featured exclusive interviews and content with big-name rappers such as 50 Cent, Ice Cube, Fat Joe, Paul Wall, & Mike Jones.

On August 20, 2013, XXL marked its sixteenth anniversary by releasing its 150th issue, which featured the first solo cover on the magazine from Drake, along with rappers such as Kendrick Lamar and B.o.B reviewing classic albums.

Annual Freshman Class list

Beginning in 2007 (skipping 2008), XXL releases its annual "Freshman Class" list. The issue features ten artists-to-watch, all appearing on the cover of the magazine. The list has a history of showcasing unknown/underground rappers, as well as artists considered to be on the rise. The list creates significant marketing buzz among listeners and artists alike, and is credited for giving many artists their first taste of fame.

The 10th spot winners are highlighted in bold.

Notes

Additions to the list 
Occasionally, the Freshman Class list may contain extra additions to include more rappers. The 2011, 2013, 2019 and 2021 Freshman Class lists, for example, had 11 rappers. In the case for the 2013 list, XXL added an honorary extra spot for Chicago rapper Chief Keef due to the artist being in a six-day jail stint and therefore being unable to attend the photo shoot in New York City. In 2014, 2020 and 2022 the Freshman Class lists included 12 rappers.

Removals from the list

References

External links

Music magazines published in the United States
Quarterly magazines published in the United States
Harris Publications titles
Hip hop magazines
Magazines established in 1997
Magazines published in New York City
African-American magazines